The 1972–73 BBC2 Floodlit Trophy was the eighth occasion on which the BBC2 Floodlit Trophy competition had been held.
This year was another new name on the trophy
Leigh won the trophy by beating Widnes by the score of 5-0
The match was played at Central Park, Wigan, (historically in the county of Lancashire). The attendance was 4,691 and receipts were £1,391
This was Leigh's first victory after being runner-up in two of the previous finals

Background 
This season saw no changes in the  entrants, no new members and no withdrawals, the number remaining at eighteen.
The format remained the  same as the  last season with the  preliminary round played on a two-legged home and away basis and the  rest of the tournament being played on a knock-out basis.
The preliminary round involved four clubs, to reduce the  numbers to sixteen.

Competition and results

Preliminary round – first leg 
Involved  2 matches and 4 clubs

Competition and results

Preliminary round – second leg 
Involved  2 matches and the same 4 Clubs in reverse fixtures

Round 1 – first round 
Involved  8 matches and 16 clubs

Round 1 – first round – replays 
Involved  1 match and 2 clubs

Round 2 – quarter finals 
Involved 4 matches with 8 clubs

Round 3 – semi-finals  
Involved 2 matches and 4 clubs

Final

Teams and scorers 

Scoring - Try = three (3) points - Goal = two (2) points - Drop goal = two (2) points

The road to success 
This tree excludes any preliminary round fixtures

Notes and comments 
1 * Wakefield Trinity, who joined the  competition in season 1967–68, win their first game in the  competition
2 * Keighley (who joined the competition in season 1967–68) win their first match in the competition
3 * This match was televised
4 * This was the second of only two occasions when the  BBC2 Floodlit Trophy final was played on a neutral ground
5 * Rothmans Rugby League Yearbook 1990-1991 and 1991-92  give the  attendance as 4,691, but RUGBYLEAGUEprojects gives it as 4,841
6 * The Widnes official archives  give this player, Bob Blackwood as number 3 but Rothmans Rugby League Yearbook 1990-91 and 1991-92 give the  position as 4
7 * The Widnes official archives  give this player, Mal Aspey as number 4 but Rothmans Tearbook 1990-91 and 1991-92 give the  position as 3
8 * The Widnes official archives  give the  stand off (No 6) as Eric Hughes but Rothmans Tearbook 1990-91 and 1991-92 give the player as Ged Lowe
9  * Central Park was the home ground of Wigan with a final capacity of 18,000, although the record attendance was  47,747 for Wigan v St Helens 27 March 1959

General information for those unfamiliar 
The Rugby League BBC2 Floodlit Trophy was a knock-out competition sponsored by the BBC and between rugby league clubs, entrance to which was conditional upon the club having floodlights. Most matches were played on an evening, and those of which the second half was televised, were played on a Tuesday evening.
Despite the competition being named as 'Floodlit', many matches took place during the afternoons and not under floodlights, and several of the entrants, including  Barrow and Bramley did not have adequate lighting. And, when in 1973, due to the world oil crisis, the government restricted the use of floodlights in sport, all the matches, including the Trophy final, had to be played in the afternoon rather than at night.
The Rugby League season always (until the onset of "Summer Rugby" in 1996) ran from around August-time through to around May-time and this competition always took place early in the season, in the Autumn, with the final taking place in December (The only exception to this was when disruption of the fixture list was caused by inclement weather)

See also 
1972–73 Northern Rugby Football League season
1972 Lancashire Cup
1972 Yorkshire Cup
BBC2 Floodlit Trophy
Rugby league county cups

References

External links
Saints Heritage Society
1896–97 Northern Rugby Football Union season at wigan.rlfans.com
Hull&Proud Fixtures & Results 1896/1897
Widnes Vikings - One team, one passion Season In Review - 1896-97
The Northern Union at warringtonwolves.org
Huddersfield R L Heritage

1972 in English rugby league
BBC2 Floodlit Trophy